Sophie Creux (born 8 July 1981) is a road cyclist from France. She participated at the 2012 UCI Road World Championships.

References

External links
 profile at Procyclingstats.com

1981 births
French female cyclists
Living people
Place of birth missing (living people)
Sportspeople from Chambéry
Cyclists from Auvergne-Rhône-Alpes